Parathymosin is a protein that in humans is encoded by the PTMS gene.

References

Further reading